General Henry Beauchamp Lygon, 4th Earl Beauchamp DL (5 January 1784 – 8 September 1863), styled The Honourable Henry Lygon from 1806 until 1853, was a British Army officer and politician.

Background
Beauchamp was the third son of William Lygon, 1st Earl Beauchamp, by his wife Catharine, the only daughter of James Denn. A younger brother was Edward Pyndar Lygon, who also became a General.

Military career
Beauchamp was educated at Westminster School and Christ Church, Oxford and entered the British Army in 1803 as a cornet in the 13th Dragoons. Made a captain in the 16th Light Dragoons, Beauchamp served with the regiment during the Peninsular War from 1809 until its end in 1814. He took part in the First Battle of Porto and then in the Battle of Talavera. After the Battle of the Côa in 1810, he was wounded in the Battle of Bussaco. Beauchamp was promoted to major in the 1st Life Guards in 1815, to major-general in 1837 and received the colonelcy of the 10th Royal Hussars for life in 1843. Three years later he became lieutenant-general and finally general in 1853.

Political career
Apart from his military career Beauchamp also entered the British House of Commons in 1816, sitting as Member of Parliament for Worcestershire until 1831. He represented the county also as a Deputy Lieutenant. Beauchamp was returned to the House for the newly established constituency Worcestershire West in 1832, holding the seat until 1853. In that year he succeeded his elder brother John in the earldom and took his seat in the House of Lords.

Family
Lord Beauchamp married Lady Susan Caroline, second daughter of William Eliot, 2nd Earl of St Germans, in 1824. They had three sons and three daughters. Lady Susan died in January 1835, aged 37. Lord Beauchamp remained a widower until his death in September 1863, aged 79. He was succeeded in the earldom by his second but eldest surviving son, Henry.

References

External links 
 

1784 births
1863 deaths
10th Royal Hussars officers
People educated at Westminster School, London
Alumni of Christ Church, Oxford
British Army generals
British Life Guards officers
Deputy Lieutenants of Worcestershire
Henry 4
Henry
Members of the Parliament of the United Kingdom for Worcestershire
UK MPs 1812–1818
UK MPs 1818–1820
UK MPs 1820–1826
UK MPs 1826–1830
UK MPs 1830–1831
UK MPs 1832–1835
UK MPs 1835–1837
UK MPs 1837–1841
UK MPs 1841–1847
UK MPs 1847–1852
UK MPs 1852–1857
Beauchamp, E4
British Army personnel of the Peninsular War